Irina Ushakova (born 29 September 1954) is a Soviet fencer. She won a silver medal in the women's team foil event at the 1980 Summer Olympics.

References

1954 births
Living people
Belarusian female foil fencers
Soviet female foil fencers
Olympic fencers of the Soviet Union
Fencers at the 1980 Summer Olympics
Olympic silver medalists for the Soviet Union
Sportspeople from Gomel
Olympic medalists in fencing
Medalists at the 1980 Summer Olympics